Lephalale Local Municipality is located in the Waterberg District Municipality of Limpopo province, South Africa. The seat of Lephalale Local Municipality is Lephalale.

Politics 
In the 2004 South African general election, the ANC won with an overwhelming majority of 88% (with 27,299 votes), while the Democratic Alliance (DA) and Freedom Front Plus (FF+, Afrikaans: VF+) only received 7% and 2% respectively.

In the 2009 South African general election, the ANC's support fell to 82.0% (24,451 votes), while the DA increased their vote percentage to 8.5% (2,521 votes) and COPE, a newly formed party, gained 5.7% (1,697 votes) of the vote. The Freedom Front Plus, the now 4th largest part, lost some support to 1.61% (480 votes), albeit only 17 fewer votes.

In the most recent 2014 South African general election, the ANC once again won overwhelmingly but again lost support, this time earning 73.8%. Much of its losses went to the new Economic Freedom Fighters which gained 10.9% and a third place. DA remained in second position and increased their support to 11.3%. COPE lost almost all its support and gained only 0.7%.

Local elections 
The municipal council consists of twenty-six members elected by mixed-member proportional representation. Thirteen councillors are elected by first-past-the-post voting in thirteen wards, while the remaining thirteen are chosen from party lists so that the total number of party representatives is proportional to the number of votes received. In the election of 3 August 2016 the African National Congress (ANC) won a majority of seventeen seats on the council.
The following table shows the results of the election.

Main places
The 2001 census divided the municipality into the following main places:

References

External links 
 Official homepage

Local municipalities of the Waterberg District Municipality